Salvador Villalba (born 29 August 1924) is a Paraguayan football midfielder who played for Paraguay in the 1958 FIFA World Cup. He also played for Club Libertad.

References

External links
FIFA profile

1924 births
Possibly living people
Paraguayan footballers
Paraguay international footballers
Association football midfielders
Club Libertad footballers
1958 FIFA World Cup players